Terence Gordon Manners (born 19 October 1939 in Levin) is a former marathon runner from New Zealand.

In the 1972 marathon at Munich he came 34th.
In the 1974 marathon at Christchurch he came 4th.
In the 1978 marathon at Edmonton he came 13th.

References 
 Black Gold by Ron Palenski (2008, 2004 New Zealand Sports Hall of Fame, Dunedin) p. 64

External links 
 
 

Living people
1939 births
New Zealand male marathon runners
New Zealand male long-distance runners
Athletes (track and field) at the 1972 Summer Olympics
Athletes (track and field) at the 1974 British Commonwealth Games
Athletes (track and field) at the 1978 Commonwealth Games
Commonwealth Games competitors for New Zealand
Olympic athletes of New Zealand